Xavier Kuhn (born 1978) is a French freestyle skier. He represents France at the 2010 Winter Olympics in Vancouver.

References

External links

1978 births
French male freestyle skiers
Olympic freestyle skiers of France
Freestyle skiers at the 2010 Winter Olympics
Living people